1962 in Argentine football saw Boca Juniors win the Argentine Primera. Racing Club were Argentina's representatives in the Copa Libertadores where they were eliminated in the first round.

Topscorer
Luis Artime was the top scorer in 1962.

Relegation

References

Argentina 1962 by Osvaldo José Gorgazzi at rsssf.
Copa Libertadores 1962 by José Luis Pierrend, John Beuker and Osvaldo José Gorgazzi at rsssf.

      

pl:I liga argentyńska w piłce nożnej (1962)